Fathabad (also Romanized as Fatḩābād) is a village in Vardasht Rural District, in the Central District of Semirom County, Isfahan Province, Iran. At the 2006 census, its population was 836, in 145 families.

References 

Populated places in Semirom County